Akaa is a town and a municipality in Pirkanmaa, Finland. It was created on January 1, 2007 when the town of Toijala and the municipality of Viiala were united into a single town. The municipality of Kylmäkoski was consolidated with Akaa on 1 January 2011.

Geography 
Akaa's neighboring municipalities are Hämeenlinna, Lempäälä, Urjala, Valkeakoski and Vesilahti.

Akaa, as well as the town of Toijala and the former municipality of Viiala are situated by the lake Vanajavesi, which is the most central watercourse in the Tavastia Proper region as well as in the southern parts of the Pirkanmaa region.

Demographics 
In 2020, 16.5% of the population of Akaa was under the age of 15, 59.3% were aged 15 to 64, and 24.2% were over the age of 65. The average age was 44.6, over the national average of 43.4 and regional average of 42.8. Speakers of Finnish made up 97.4% of the population and speakers of Swedish made up 0.2%, while the share of speakers of foreign languages was 2.4%. Foreign nationals made up 1.8% of the total population. 

The chart below, describing the development of the total population of Akaa from 1975-2020, encompasses the municipality's area as of 2021.

Urban areas 

In 2019, out of the total population of 16,475, 14,323 people lived in urban areas and 1,995 in sparsely populated areas, while the coordinates of 157 people were unknown. This made Akaa's degree of urbanization 87.8%. The urban population in the municipality was divided between four urban areas as follows:

Notable people 
 Arvo Ylppö (1887–1992), Finnish pediatrician

International relations

Twin towns — Sister cities
Akaa is twinned with:

  Sande, Norway
  Hallsberg Municipality, Sweden  
  Tapa, Estonia

References

External links 
 
 
 Town of Akaa  – Official website

 
Cities and towns in Finland
Populated places established in 2007